The 2017 Ayorou attack occurred on 21 October 2017 when armed militants attacked a Nigerien military outpost in the village of Ayorou in southwestern Niger, killing 13 gendarmes. Occurring just weeks after a similar attack in the area killed four American and four Nigerien troops, the attack was carried out by gunmen who crossed the porous border from Mali. At dawn, militants in 4-5 vehicles and motorcycles and armed with machine guns and rocket launchers attacked paramilitary policemen in Ayorou, a small town on the banks of the Niger River 200 kilometers (125 mi) northwest of Niamey. Thirteen gendarmes were killed and five others were wounded. At least one of the attackers was killed as well. The attackers fled after police reinforcements arrived and pursued them to the border. A similar raid was carried out on the same outpost the previous May.

In a statement released by the U.S. embassy, the United States strongly condemned the attack and offered condolences to the families of the victims.

See also

 Tongo Tongo ambush

References

Ayorou
Ayorou 2017
Ayorou
Ayorou
Ayorou 2017
Ayorou 2017
Ayorou